Searchmont Resort is a ski resort located in the community of Searchmont, Ontario, Canada, and mainly caters to residents of Sault Ste. Marie, Ontario and Algoma, which is 45 minutes away. The area has a 703 vertical foot drop, featuring 26 runs and six lifts (one quad, three triple, and two belt lifts).

Searchmont Resort was formerly governed by a Nonprofit organization called "Searchmont Ski Association Inc." (SSAI). In December 2014, Searchmont Resort was purchased by the economic development corporation of Sault Ste. Marie. Searchmont Resort was primarily funded by the Northern Ontario Heritage Fund to pay for services provided by Destination North.

On November 1, 2018, Detroit-based Wisconsin Resorts Inc. purchased Searchmont Resort from the Economic Development Corporation of Sault Ste. Marie.

Searchmont Resort offers ski and snowboarding lessons to people of all ages and skills. 

On August 10th, 2021 Searchmont Resort committed to opening for the upcoming ski and snowboard 2021-2022 season.  On September 20, 2021 Searchmont announced that construction of towers for a new triple lift had started to happen ahead of the winter 2022 season. The new lift be called "Buzzsaw" will feed into two new trails, "Buzzsaw" and "Lumberjack", which themselves will be located just behind the learning centre. The two new trails will be intermediate runs allowing a smooth transition for newer skiers and snowboarders to the other trails.

See also
 List of ski areas and resorts in Canada

References

External links 
 Community of Searchmont
 Searchmont Resort
 Searchmont and Area Freestyle Association
 Community of Searchmont

Ski areas and resorts in Ontario
Algoma District